Pakistan International Public School & College (Urdu:پاکستان انٹرنیشنل پبلک سکول اینڈ کالج), usually abbreviated to its acronym PIPS is a private residential school situated in Abbottabad city of the Khyber Pakhtunkhwa province of Pakistan with branches in cities of Khyber Pakhtunkhwa and Punjab. The parent institute in Abbottabad has two separate campuses, Boys Campus known as Senior PIPS is situated on a hill at Jhangi Khoja near Mandian while Girls Campus usually referred to as Junior PIPS is situated at PMA Link Road in Jinnahabad and collectively they are known as PIPS Abbottabad.

History
The school was founded in 1983 by Brig. (r) Ijaz Akbar and Muhammad Arshad Adil, Ijaz Akbar until then had served as the principal of the boys section of Army Burn Hall College, also in Abbottabad. It was established by the Pakistan Education Association, a government registered body of the North West Frontier Province(NWFP), now Khyber Pakhtunkhwa.

Administration 
The college and its branches has been managed by Brig. (r) Ijaz Akbar as Managing Director who also served as principal of Junior PIPS until his death after which his sons took the charge as college's managing directors. A retired brigadier of Pakistan Army serves as principal of Senior PIPS.

Academics and activities 
PIPS Abbottabad under former principal Brig. (r) Ihsan Khattak enjoyed prestigious position in the region over the years and produced excellent results in BISE, Abbottabad with topping the matric and inter exams several times. Other than curricular activities, college also regularly participates in and co-curricular activities and won positions in national and international competitions. The college has also remained sports champion of BISE, Abbottabad over the years winning various sports competitions annually organized by Abbottabad Board.
However in past couple of years due to continuous administrative changes, the college saw a decline in its progress and its performance deteriorated.

Branches
The college has a few other branches in Punjab and Khyber Pakhtunkhwa provinces. The most notable branch among them is PIPS Gujranwala situated in Gujranwala, Punjab while others in Gujrat and Sargodha. Some independent branches are also running in Sheikhupura, Haripur and Swabi. Another branch has also recently been started in Mansehra. The college claims to be one of the largest private boarding schools in Pakistan and previously ranked among top schools in the country.

See also 

 Army Burn Hall College
 Abbottabad Public School

References

Abbottabad District
Schools in Abbottabad
Schools in Khyber Pakhtunkhwa
Schools in Pakistan
Boarding schools in Pakistan
Boys' schools in Pakistan
Girls' schools in Pakistan
Private schools in Pakistan